Bech is a commune and small town in eastern Luxembourg. It is part of the canton of Echternach, which is part of the district of Grevenmacher.

, the town of Bech, which lies in the east of the commune, has a population of 368. Villages within the commune include Altrier and Rippig.

Population

References

External links
 

Towns in Luxembourg
Communes in Echternach (canton)